João José "Pipoka" Vianna (born 15 November 1963), is a Brazilian former professional basketball player. At a height of 2.06 m (6'9") tall, he played at the power forward position.

Professional career
During his pro club career, Vianna won 5 Brazilian Championships, in the seasons 1985, 1986 (I), 1986 (II), 1987, and 2007. Vianna also played briefly with the Dallas Mavericks of the National Basketball Association (NBA), during the 1991–92 season, becoming just the second Brazilian player to play in the NBA, after Rolando Ferreira.

Vianna played for Maratonistas de Coamo in Puerto Rico from 1989 to 1991, and in 1993.

National team career
Vianna represented the senior Brazilian national basketball team at the 1988 Summer Olympics, the 1992 Summer Olympics, and the 1996 Summer Olympics, as well as several other international competitions.  He was also a part of the Brazilian national team that won the 1987 Pan American Games, in Indianapolis, over Team USA.

He also played at the 1986 FIBA World Cup, the 1990 FIBA World Cup, the 1994 FIBA World Cup, and the 1998 FIBA World Cup.

References

External links
 FIBA Profile
 NBA statistics 
 CBB Player Profile 

1963 births
Living people
1986 FIBA World Championship players
1998 FIBA World Championship players
Basketball players at the 1987 Pan American Games
Basketball players at the 1988 Summer Olympics
Basketball players at the 1992 Summer Olympics
Basketball players at the 1996 Summer Olympics
Brazilian men's basketball players
1990 FIBA World Championship players
Clube Atlético Monte Líbano basketball players
Dallas Mavericks players
Flamengo basketball players
Maratonistas de Coamo players
National Basketball Association players from Brazil
Olympic basketball players of Brazil
Pan American Games competitors for Brazil
Power forwards (basketball)
Sociedade Esportiva Palmeiras basketball players
Undrafted National Basketball Association players
UniCEUB/BRB players
1994 FIBA World Championship players
Sportspeople from Brasília